Living the Dream was the New Zealand version of Spike TV's Joe Schmo Show, produced by Touchdown Television for TV2.

While initially well received by viewers, later in year when the first season of The Joe Schmo Show aired in New Zealand it became clear that Living the Dream was actually a direct-copy of the original, creating a small level of blacklash as the producers had stated in the past the show was merely based on Joe Schmo.

Description 
It was a reality TV show (actually a parody of reality game shows) that began airing in August 2004 and involves a setup that is reminiscent of the movie The Truman Show.

One man, Sam Chambers, thinks he's on a reality TV show called Living the Dream. However, all of the other members in this reality TV show, including the host, are actually actors and the entire show is an elaborate hoax centred on the main character. All of the events and games played are staged to give a particular outcome designed to elicit a response from the main character for comedic effect.

The other "contestants" are stereotypes of common reality TV show contestants. They are (real names follow character names/descriptions):

 Mick the Prick – Jason Fitch
 Rima, the Schemer – Awanui Simich-Pene
 Billy the Gay Guy – Jeremy Birchall 
 Mule the Former SAS Soldier – Stephan Hall 
 Betty the New Age flake – Kirsty Cooke
 Tiffany the Rich Bitch – Sarah Thomson 
 Ben the Best Mate Charlie McDermott 
 Mary the Virgin – Victoria Blackman 
 Mark Ferguson, the Smarmy host – Himself

At the end of the show, Chambers received the $50,000 prize for which he was "competing" as well as all the other prizes given away in the show.

Sam's colloquial exclamation "Crikey!" became the show's catchphrase.

References

Reality television series parodies
Living the Dream
TVNZ 2 original programming